Victor Andrew Miller (August 27, 1916 – July 18, 1984) was interim Attorney General of Wisconsin from October 8 until November 25, 1974.

Background
Born in the Town of Eaton, Manitowoc County, Wisconsin, Miller received his bachelor's degree from Marquette University, in 1938, and his law degree from Marquette University Law School in 1940. Miller practiced law in Manitowoc, Wisconsin. He was appointed by Governor Patrick J. Lucey to fill a vacancy upon the resignation of Robert W. Warren, and resigned when Governor Lucey appointed Bronson La Follette, who had been elected Attorney General of Wisconsin in the 1974 election. Miller lived in St. Nazianz, Wisconsin.

References

External links

1916 births
1984 deaths
People from Manitowoc County, Wisconsin
Marquette University alumni
Marquette University Law School alumni
Wisconsin Attorneys General
Wisconsin Democrats
20th-century American politicians